GSFC may refer to:

 Goddard Space Flight Center, a major NASA center in Maryland, US
 Gujarat State Fertilizers and Chemicals, in India
 GSFC University, established 2015 in Vadodara, Gujarat, India